Dinesh Chand (born 6 February 1972) is a Fijian professional golfer who plays mainly on the Japan Golf Tour.

At the end of 2009, he lost his full playing rights for the Japan Golf Tour and so decided to play on the developmental Japan Challenge Tour in 2010. He won two events in a row which resulted in him regaining his full playing rights for the second half of the Japan Golf Tour season. He finished second at the 2010 Sun Chlorella Classic.

Chand has three wins on the Japan Golf Tour, and two on the Japan Challenge Tour.

Professional wins (6)

Japan Golf Tour wins (3)

Japan Challenge Tour wins (2)

Other wins (1)
2008 Hirao Masaaki Charity Golf

Results in major championships

Note: Chand only played in The Open Championship.

CUT = missed the half-way cut

Team appearances
WGC-World Cup (representing Fiji): 2001, 2002

External links

Fijian male golfers
Japan Golf Tour golfers
Asian Tour golfers
Fijian people of Indian descent
1972 births
Living people